Al-Sadiq Mosque is a mosque located in Bahawalpur, Punjab, Pakistan. 

Between 50,000 and 60,000 people can pray in the mosque at a time. The mosque covers an area of 24 canal.

History
Its foundation stone was laid by Great Sufi of Chishtia clan and the Spiritual Master of Nawab of Bahawalpur Noor Muhammad Maharvi more than 200 years ago. The renovation was done by the order of Sir Sadiq Muhammad Khan Abbasi in 1935 after returning from Hajj.

See also
List of mosques in Pakistan
 Islam in Pakistan
Moorish Mosque, Kapurthala

References

Bahawalpur (princely state)
Mosques in Punjab, Pakistan
Tourist attractions in Bahawalpur
1860s establishments in British India